Vemulapalli is a village in Yellanur Mandal in Anantapur district of Andhra Pradesh, India.
Its actual name is  'DharaNi vemulapalli'  - "Dharani Vemulapalli Dhamuna Sakshigaa"

Demographics
As of 2001 India census, Vemulapalli has a population of 1015 in 247 households.

As per the 2011 census data, the total population of Vemulapalli is 2,131 residing in 558 households. The total population constitute 1,073 males and 1,058 females.

It is in 69 meters above sea level.

References

Villages in Anantapur district